Günther Abel (born 22 November 1956) is a German Nordic combined skier. He competed in the 1976 and 1980 Winter Olympics.

References

1956 births
Living people
Nordic combined skiers at the 1976 Winter Olympics
Nordic combined skiers at the 1980 Winter Olympics
German male Nordic combined skiers
Olympic Nordic combined skiers of West Germany
People from Winterberg
Sportspeople from Arnsberg (region)